San Antonio de Padua de la Concordia (usually shortened to Concordia) is a city in the north-east of the province of Entre Ríos in the Argentine Mesopotamia.

History

Geography
Concordia lies on the right-hand (western) shore of the Uruguay River, opposite the city of Salto in Uruguay. The two cities are joined by a road/railway link that is part of the Salto Grande Dam complex (starting on the Argentine side 18 km north from the center of Concordia).

Climate
According to the Köppen climate classification, Concordia has a humid subtropical climate (Cfa). Fall (March to May) is the wettest season while winter (June to August) is the driest season. However, there is great year to year variability in annual precipitation. The frost free period is 10 months long and in an average year, there are 8.6 days with frost.

Nature
The city is known as the national capital of citrus production. El Palmar National Park, an important reserve for Yatay palm trees, lies 60 km south of the city.

Transport

Notable people 

 Isidoro Blaisten (1933–2004), journalist
 Gustavo Ruiz Díaz (b. 1981), footballer
 Isaac Ganón (1916–1975), sociologist
 Celestino Piaggio (1886–1931), composer
 Isabel Sarli (1929-2019), actress and model
 Joaquin Szuchman (b. 1995), Israeli-Argentinian professional basketball player in the Israel Basketball Premier League

Gallery

References

External links

 
 Municipality of Concordia – Official website
 TurismoEntreRios.com – Tourism portal of the province of Entre Ríos

 
Populated places in Entre Ríos Province
Uruguay River
Argentina–Uruguay border crossings
Populated places established in 1831
Cities in Argentina
Argentina
Entre Ríos Province